Bears Football Club (Bears FC, officially known  as Insurance Management Bears FC or IM Bears FC for sponsorship reasons) is a football club based in Nassau, Bahamas. Bears FC plays in BFA Senior League in Bahamas.

History
In 1996 Anton Sealey upon being elected president of The Bahamas Football Association (BFA) on taking office set as his administrations priorities:

In pursuance of priority two, with a grant from the company with whom he worked, Insurance Management Bahamas Ltd., he began teaching soccer at Queen's College on Saturdays to a group of young players predominantly attending Queen's College. The sessions which began with twelve youngsters grew steadily each week. At the same time Fred Lunn and his brother Lionel, together with current BFA general secretary Lionel Haven and BFA Vice-President Stanley Darville began a similar program at The College of The Bahamas field in Oakes Field, called Get Kickin' As both schools or camps as they were called expanded outgrowing their resources, Anton and Fred saw the wisdom of combining their resources to more effectively deliver quality instruction to their charges, thus the Insurance Management Youth Football Club was born.

They have won the Bahamas President's Cup in consecutive seasons. They have also won the New Providence Football League five times in a row, and six times in total. They won the Grand Bahama FA Cup a record five consecutive times. The main sponsor and owner of club is Scotiabank.

Jersey
Its jersey features a red shirt with red sleeves and white shorts.

Squad

Achievements
 Brixton Footy Addicts League Winners 2020/21
Bahamas National Championship Final 6
 2002/03, 2008/09, 2009/10, 2010/11, 2011/12, 2013

Bahamas President's Cup: 2
 2009/10, 2010/11

New Providence Football League: 5
 2001/02, 2002/03, 2003/04, 2007, 2008

New Providence FA Cup: 6
 2002/03, 2003/04, 2005/06, 2006/07, 2010, 2011/12

Bahamas Charity Shield: 2
 2010, 2011

References

External links
 FC Bears 2014–15

Football clubs in the Bahamas
Association football clubs established in 1996
1996 establishments in the Bahamas